Archytas is a lunar impact crater that protrudes into the northern edge of Mare Frigoris. To the northwest is the comparably sized crater Timaeus, and the smaller Protagoras lies in the opposite direction to the southeast. Further to the southwest, beyond the opposite edge of the mare, is the dark-floored crater Plato.

The rim of Archytas is sharp-edged and shows little appearance of erosion due to subsequent impacts. The outer wall is nearly circular, with a slight outward bulge in the southeast. The interior is rough, with a ring of material deposited at the base of the inner wall. Just to the east of the crater midpoint is a pair of central peaks.

The surface surrounding the crater is relatively smooth to the south  due to the lava flows that formed the mare. The surface is more rugged to the north and northeast. The satellite crater Archytas B, located to the northwest of Archytas, forms a lava-flooded bay along the edge of the Mare Frigoris.

Satellite craters
By convention these features are identified on lunar maps by placing the letter on the side of the crater midpoint that is closest to Archytas.

References

External links
 

Impact craters on the Moon